The Republic of the Congo was a sovereign state in Central Africa, created with the independence of the Belgian Congo in 1960. From 1960 to 1966, the country was also known as Congo-Léopoldville (after its capital) to distinguish it from its northwestern neighbor, which is also called the Republic of the Congo, alternatively known as "Congo-Brazzaville". In 1964, the state's official name was changed to the Democratic Republic of the Congo, but the two countries continued to be distinguished by their capitals; with the renaming of Léopoldville as Kinshasa in 1966, it became also known as Congo-Kinshasa. After Joseph Désiré Mobutu, commander-in-chief of the national army, seized control of the government, the Democratic Republic of the Congo became the Republic of Zaire in 1971. It would again become the Democratic Republic of the Congo in 1997. The period between 1960 and 1964 is referred to as the First Congolese Republic.

Colonial rule

Conditions in the Congo improved following the Belgian government's takeover in 1908 of the Congo Free State, which had been a personal possession of the Belgian king. Some Bantu languages were taught in primary schools, a rare occurrence in colonial education. Colonial doctors greatly reduced the spread of African trypanosomiasis, commonly known as sleeping sickness.

During World War II, the small Congolese army achieved several victories against the Italians in East Africa. The Belgian Congo, which was also rich in uranium deposits, supplied the uranium that was used by the United States to build the atomic weapons.

The colonial administration implemented a variety of economic reforms to improve infrastructure: railways, ports, roads, mines, plantations and industrial areas. The Congolese people, however, lacked political power and faced legal discrimination. All colonial policies were decided in Brussels and Léopoldville. The Belgian Colony-secretary and Governor-general, neither elected by the Congolese people, wielded absolute power.

Among the Congolese people, resistance against their undemocratic regime grew over time. In 1955, the Congolese upper class (the so-called "évolués"), many of whom had been educated in Europe, initiated a campaign to end the inequality.

Congo Crisis

In May 1960, the MNC party or Mouvement National Congolais, led by Patrice Lumumba, won the parliamentary elections, and Lumumba was appointed Prime Minister. Joseph Kasa-Vubu of ABAKO was elected president by the parliament. Other parties that emerged include the Parti Solidaire Africain (PSA), led by Antoine Gizenga, and the Parti National du Peuple (PNP), led by Albert Delvaux and Laurent Mbariko.

The Belgian Congo achieved independence on 30 June 1960. On 1 July Lumumba sent a wire to the UN to request membership, stating that the Congo "accepts without reservation the obligations stipulated in the Charter of the UN and undertakes to abide by the same in absolute good faith." UN Secretary-General Dag Hammarskjöld cabled the Foreign Ministry, pointing out the difficulty in admitting the country into the UN under its name in the face of another application for membership from the neighboring Congo, preparing for independence from French control. A delegation was sent from Brazzaville, the capital of the French Congo, to Léopoldville to resolve the matter. In the end, it was decided that the former Belgian Congo would be recognised as the Republic of the Congo or Congo-Léopoldville while the former French Congo would be known as the Congolese Republic or Congo-Brazzaville. Following a constitutional referendum in 1964 it was renamed the "Democratic Republic of the Congo", and in 1971 it was changed again to "Republic of Zaïre".

Secessionist movements 
Shortly after independence, the provinces of Katanga (with Moise Tshombe) and South Kasai engaged in secessionist struggles against the new leadership.

Subsequent events led to a crisis between President Kasa-Vubu and Prime Minister Lumumba. On 5 September 1960, Kasavubu dismissed Lumumba from office. Lumumba declared Kasa-Vubu's action "unconstitutional" and a crisis between the two leaders developed.

Lumumba had previously appointed Joseph Mobutu chief of staff of the new Congolese army, the Armee Nationale Congolaise (ANC). Taking advantage of the leadership crisis between Kasa-Vubu and Lumumba, Mobutu garnered enough support within the army to inspire mutinous action. With financial support from the United States and Belgium, Mobutu made payments to his soldiers to generate their loyalty. The aversion of Western powers towards communism and leftist ideology, in general, influenced their decision to finance Mobutu's quest to maintain "order" in the new state by neutralizing Kasa-Vubu and Lumumba in a coup by proxy.

On 17 January 1961, Katangan forces, supported by the Belgian government, which desired to retain mining rights for copper and diamonds in Katanga and South Kasai, executed Patrice Lumumba and several of his aides at a pig farm near Élisabethville. From 1960 to 1964 the peacekeeping effort was the largest, most complex, and most costly operation ever carried out by the United Nations.

Coup d'état 
Following five years of extreme instability and civil unrest, Joseph-Désiré Mobutu, then Lieutenant General, overthrew Kasa-Vubu in a 1965 CIA-backed coup. He had the support of the US for his staunch opposition to communism, which would presumably make him a roadblock to communist activities in Africa.

Mobutu declared himself president for five years, saying that he needed that long to undo the damage that the politicians had done in the country's first five years of independence. However, within two years, he had set up the Popular Movement of the Revolution as the country's only legal party. In 1970, he appeared alone on the ballot in the country's first direct presidential election. Two weeks later, a single list of PMR candidates was elected to the legislature. For all intents and purposes, the Democratic Republic of the Congo had effectively come to an end, but it would be another year before Mobutu officially changed the country's name to Zaire.

Flags/Coats of arms

See also 
 History of the Democratic Republic of the Congo

Citations

General and cited sources

Further reading
 Frank R. Villafaña, Cold War in the Congo: The Confrontation of Cuban Military Forces, 1960–1967. Piscataway, NJ: Transaction Publishers, 2012.

1960 establishments in the Republic of the Congo
1971 disestablishments in Africa
Léopoldville
Library of Congress Africa Collection related
States and territories established in 1960
States and territories disestablished in 1971